Skalice may refer to the places:

Czech Republic
Skalice (Hradec Králové District), a municipality and village in the Hradec Králové Region
Skalice (Tábor District), a municipality and village in the South Bohemian Region
Skalice (Znojmo District), a municipality and village in the South Moravian Region
Skalice (Frýdek-Místek), a village and administrative part of Frýdek-Místek in the Moravian-Silesian Region
Skalice nad Svitavou, a municipality and village in the South Moravian Region
Skalice u České Lípy, a municipality and village in the Liberec Region
Česká Skalice, a town in the Hradec Králové Region
Malá Skalice, a village and administrative part of Česká Skalice
Klášterní Skalice, a municipality and village in the Central Bohemian Region
Stříbrná Skalice, a municipality and village in the Central Bohemian Region
Skalice, a village and administrative part of Hrochův Týnec in the Pardubice Region
Skalice, a village and administrative part of Nečín in the Central Bohemian Region
Skalice, a village and administrative part of Struhařov in the Central Bohemian Region
Skalice, a village and administrative part of Třebívlice in the Ústí nad Labem Region
Skalice, a village and administrative part of Žitenice in the Ústí nad Labem Region
Malá Skalice, a village and administrative part of Zbraslavice in the Central Bohemian Region
Velká Skalice, a village and administrative part of Zbraslavice in the Central Bohemian Region

Poland
Skalice, Lower Silesian Voivodeship, a village

See also